Bornellidae is a family of nudibranch sea slug - marine gastropod molluscs in the superfamily Tritonioidea.

This family is within the clade Cladobranchia (according to the taxonomy of the Gastropoda by Bouchet & Rocroi, 2005).

Description 
Nudibranch species within the Bornellidae family have elongated bodies, with pairs of cerata-like dorsal and lateral appendages, with finger-like branches, running along the length of the body. Each of these appendages has an attached cluster of gills. Their rounded head has a tentacle on either side of the mouth, with tiny finger-like papillae. The rhinophores on the head resemble the dorsal appendages. 

Nudibranchs within this family are believed to feed exclusively on hydroids.

Genera 
 Bornella  Gray, 1850  (with at least ten species)
Pseudobornella  Baba, 1932  (monotypic : P. orientalis)

References

 
Gastropod families